The Spyder Rodeo is a paintball marker designed and manufactured by Kingman Group.

Design
The Spyder Rodeo is available in a black, green or camouflage color schemes. As with all other Spyders, it is a semi-automatic stacked tube blowback. It has a regulator with a gauge, drop forward and matte finish anodizing. It operates on carbon dioxide or compressed air and has a low-pressure, in-line expansion chamber with fore grip, velocity adjuster and bottom-line setup. The Rodeo has a vertical, anti-double feed and a deluxe sight rail with beavertail. It is a two-finger (or Double Trigger) aluminium trigger semi-automatic.

See also
Spyder MR1, designed for military simulation

References

External links
Kingman Group official website

Paintball markers